Hu Zhiyu (1227–1293), also known as Purple Mountain Hu, was a period writer of Chinese Sanqu poetry during the Yuan dynasty. He was from Hebei and orphaned early in life. Nonetheless, he applied himself to his studies and associated with others of exceptional ability. In the 1260s he rose to the high official position of Erudite of the Court of Imperial Sacrifices. However he earned the enmity of a Muslim high minister of finance Ahmad Fanakati (?-1282). Hu was then obliged to fill lesser official positions. Others wrote of him that officials feared him while ordinary people loved him. His writings were largely poetry. He was much influenced by Song poetry with its directness and lack or ornament. His sanqu (散曲) verses were highly literate, a characteristic of the time. He was likewise gifted at a variety of literary forms, as well as a skilled calligrapher.

(Shuangdiao: Chenzui tongfeng)

For the Actress Zhu Lianxiu

By the river stitched in colors,

Kingfisher-green bamboos.

Above the wool-dressed sea

There is a bright pearl.

When the moon is pale,

Where the wind is pure,

The dust from fallen crimson is shut away.

A bit of careless ease

Bears the strains of life,

My constant thinking

Of love's morning clouds and evening rains.

See also
 Qu (poetry)

References 
 Hu Qiaomu ed., The Great Encyclopedia of China, Chinese Literature, vol. 1, Beijing-Shanghai, 1986, p 271.
 Lu Weifen ed., Complete Yuan Period Sanqu Lyrics, Liaoning, 2000, vol. 1, pp. 157–9.
 Ma Liangchun　and Li Futian ed., The Great Encyclopedia of Chinese Literature, Tianlu, 1991, vol. 6, p. 4190.
 Carpenter, Bruce E. "Chinese San-ch’ü Poetry of the Mongol Era: I", Tezukayama Daigaku kiyo (Journal of Tezukayama University), Nara, Japan, no. 22, p. 34.

Yuan dynasty poets
13th-century Chinese poets
1227 births
1293 deaths
Poets from Hebei